S. Chandira Priyanga is an Indian politician from All India NR Congress. In May 2016, she was elected as a member of the Puducherry Legislative Assembly from Nedungadu (constituency). The induction of Chandira Priyanga means that Puducherry will have its first woman minister in 41 years. She defeated A. Marimuthu of Indian National Congress by 8,560 votes in 2021 Puducherry Assembly election. She is the daughter of former Puducherry minister M Chandirakasu.

Chandira has also acted in a short film called Jhansi in 2019.

References 

Living people
21st-century Indian politicians
People from Karaikal
All India NR Congress politicians
Puducherry MLAs 2021–2026
Puducherry MLAs 2016–2021
1989 births